Come Original is a single by American alternative rock band 311, first released on their 1999 album Soundsystem. It was later released on the compilation album Greatest Hits '93-'03. The song references other artists such as Mr. Vegas, Black Eyed Peas, Roni Size, and Nofx.

Music video
The music video for "Come Original" features the band playing the song in front of a green background with a barcode, and a couple of stereo speakers (that is a rendition of the album's artwork), as well of scenes involving skateboarding on a ramp and various people performing breakdancing.

Charts

References

External links

1999 singles
311 (band) songs
Songs written by P-Nut
Songs written by Nick Hexum
Songs written by SA Martinez
Song recordings produced by Hugh Padgham
1999 songs
Music videos directed by Kevin Kerslake